Ansan (Hangeul:) is a city in Gyeonggi Province, South Korea.  It lies southwest of Seoul and is part of the Seoul National Capital Area. It is connected to Seoul by rail via Seoul Subway Line 4. It is situated on the Yellow Sea coast and some islands lie within its jurisdiction. The largest and best-known of these is Daebu Island.

Several higher learning institutions are located in Ansan.  They include Ansan University, Shin Ansan University, Seoul Institute of the Arts, and the ERICA campus of Hanyang University. The Korea Transportation Safety Authority, a government agency, has also been headquartered in Ansan since June 3, 2002.  With its high number of foreign workers, Wongokbon-dong has been designated as a multicultural area. In 2021, Ansan was selected as the largest residential area for foreigners and it is seeking designation as a special multicultural city. Street play festival is held every year in Ansan.

History

Ancient Era
The first humans in Ansan were in the New Stone Age, and many shell middens and prehistoric remains were found at Oido, Sihwaho, Chojidong and Daebudo. In the Seonbu-dong and Wolpi-dong area, over 10 stone dolmen tombs could be found. Also in 1995, Old Stone Age relics were found while constructing the Seohaean Expressway. Most dolmens in Ansan are north dolmen, but the dolmen in Seonbu-dong is table-shaped and another table-shaped tomb was found in Hakon-dong, Gwangmyeong. There are many ancient relics found in the city.

Three Kingdoms and Goryeo Era
Not much evidence or antiquities survive from the Proto-Three Kingdoms and Samhan periods are in Ansan and nearby areas. The Mahan confederacy in Chen Shou in Records of the Three Kingdoms preserves writings about the chiefdom state. Ansan was in communion with Baekje but very little has been saved.

In the Later Three Kingdoms era, the Ansan area was owned by Taebong (also known as Hugoguryeo, "Later Goguryeo") in Silla Hyogong's 4th year (AD 900). After then, Gung Ye, who was the ruler of Taebong, was overthrown by Wang Geon, and the Ansan area was turned over to Goryeo, founded by Wang Geon. First, the Gung Ye Ganggu-gun was changed to Ansan-gun but the state of the military was preserved.

Joseon Era
Ansan belonged to Gyeonggijwa-do (left Gyeonggi province) in the Joseon dynasty. Taejo's 5th year (AD 1396), Ansan-eoso (meaning Ansan fishery) that is now under the direct control of a detached building of Saongwon (the Department of foods and meals in the Joseon dynasty) was set up. After Gyeonggijwa-do and Gyeonggiwo-do (right Gyeonggi province) were unified in Teajong's 2nd year (AD 1402), Ansan was still called Ansan. Under Teajong's 13th (1413), the whole country was detached into eight provinces.

Modern Era
Until 1914, Ansan City and the southern part of today's Siheung city consisted of Ansan County. In 1914, Ansan County was annexed to Siheung County. This region produced high-quality salt from ancient times and valuable marine products. Ansan was then a fishing village.
In 1986, several towns of Hwaseong county became incorporated, representing the beginning of Ansan as a city. With currently over 700,000 residents, Ansan now has two distinct and separate districts: Danwon, which has 12 dongs as of 2009, and Sangnok, with 13.

Geography
Portions of various Yellow Sea islands lie within its jurisdiction. The largest and best-known of these is Daebu Island, also known as "Daebudo".

Located at the south of the city (but within its jurisdiction) are islands of Daebudo and Pungdo. On land, the city boundaries is marked by the town of Gunpo to the east of Ansan, Anyang to north-east, Siheung to the north and Hwaseong to the south.

Climate
Ansan has a monsoon-influenced humid continental climate (Köppen: Dwa) with cold, dry winters and hot, rainy summers.

Transportation

Railway

The Ansan Line is a major rail line in Ansan and is part of the Seoul Metropolitan Subway as Line 4. Service connects from Oido to Jinjeop in Namyangju. The subway is also connected to the public bus system in Ansan. Previously, the first railroad in the city was the Suin Line which was opened by Korea under Japanese rule.
In mid 2020, the Suin Bundang line started operations, connecting Suwon and Ansan which expanded the living space in Ansan.

Korail

Seoul Subway Line 4 (via Ansan Line)
(Gunpo) ← Banwol — Sangnoksu — Hanyang Univ. at Ansan — Jungang — Gojan — Choji — Ansan — Singiloncheon → (Siheung)

Seohae Line
Wonsi — Siu — Choji — Seonbu — Dalmi → (Siheung)

Suin–Bundang Line (via Ansan Line)
(Hwaseong) ← Sari — Hanyang Univ. at Ansan — Jungang — Gojan — Choji — Ansan — Singiloncheon →  (Siheung)

Future expansion
Currently, Seohae Line starts from Ansan to Sosa Station in Bucheon. But the Ministry of Land, Infrastructure and Transport is extended to Goyang through Gimpo International Airport Station. It will completed by 2023.

Future Extended Seohae Line
Wonsi — Siu — Choji — Seonbu — Dalmi → (Siheung) → (Gimpo Airport) → (Goyang)

The Shin Ansan Line will connect Yeouido to Ansan in 2024. It will take only 30 minutes from Yeouido to Ansan Also, the Ministry of Land, Infrastructure and Transport is considering to extend to Seoul Station.

Future Shin Ansan Line
Hanyang University — Ansan City Hall — Jungang — Seongpo — Jangha — Mokgam → (Gwangmyeong) → (Seoul)

Bus

The Ansan Bus Terminal (안산종합버스터미널) near Ansan Station provides daily bus service to Incheon International Airport and most cities in South Korea including Gimhae-si, Busan-si. Buses travel via Gimpo International Airport and Incheon International Airport. Express buses to Iksan, Dongdaegu, and Gwangju are also available. Near Sangnoksu Station are buses going to Suwon Station and Gangnam Station.  Ansan has 53 bus lines with 537 buses operating in and out of the city limits, connecting the city with Seoul and other outlying Gyeonggi cities. The Ansan transfer center also has express city buses, city buses, and intercity buses to link to Banwol industrial estate, Sihwa lake, and nearby cities.

Pedalro 
Pedalro is a public bicycle system in Ansan City. There are 101 Pedalro stations in Ansan. This is run on a membership basis.

Public institutions
The Korea Transportation Safety Authority, a government agency in South Korea, is headquartered in Ansan. Other major institutions in Ansan include:
Korea Institute of Ocean Science & Technology
Korea Electrotechnology Research Institute
Metropolitan Air Quality Management Office
Korea Institute of Industrial Technology, Gyeonggi Province Technology Ansan Center
Korea Testing Laboratory, Ansan Center

Administrative districts
The administrative district of Ansan is parted into 25 Dong, 1187 Tong, and 5884 Ban. The extent of Ansan is 149.06 km2 (Sangnok-gu: 57.83 km2 Danwon-gu: 91.23 km2). The population standard was 281,829 households and 761,279 people at the end of 2012, of which the Korean citizen population was 715,108 with 43,465 foreigners recorded.

Education
Ansan had Hyanggyo, nationally sponsored schools, throughout the Joseon Dynasty and Goryeo. Modern institutions of higher learning located in Ansan include Ansan University, Shin Ansan University, Seoul Institute of the Arts, and the ERICA campus of Hanyang University.

List of universities in Ansan:
 Ansan University
 Hanyang University, ERICA Campus at Ansan
 Seoul Institute of the Arts
 Shin Ansan University

There are 24 high schools, 29 middle schools, 54 elementary schools and 96 kindergartens in the city. Danwon High School in Ansan was particularly affected by the Sinking of the MV Sewol in 2014 as a large number of the passengers were students from the school, and city streets featured many ribbon memorials and other markers and ceremonies for the disaster. Ansan Seo Elementary School a.k.a. Ansan West Elementary School (안산서초등학교) in Wongok-dong has a multicultural program with students from other countries, a rarity in South Korean education.

Economy
Because Ansan is a planned city built behind the Ansan Smart Hub following the government's industrial planning, the proportion of agriculture in the Ansan economy is very low. Meanwhile, as the government promoted a manufacturing industry plan in the Ansan area before Ansan was built, many people work in the manufacturing industry. There are two national industrial complexes, Banwol and Sihwa, as well as the local Banwol plating industrial complex.

Cultural institutions and heritage
In the past, Ansan had fewer attractions and a poor reputation due to its industrial and fishing roots, but the east side of the city has recently experienced several beautification projects. The canal systems which bisect the city have bicycling and walking paths, and are covered with roses, tulips, and cherry blossoms in spring. A community bicycle system sponsored by the city is also available for park access and riding. Nowadays, Ansan has many museums and galleries, such as the Ansan Culture and Arts Center, Seongho Memorial Hall, Danwon Sculpture Park, and Hwarang Public Garden. Ansan has run city bus tours for cultural heritage sightseeing since 2008.

Events
The Jet-mer-ri village deity is held every year in the Jet-mer-ri shrine to the village deity from 1984, and since 1987 the Beal-Mang-Sung art festival is held. Also, since 1991 the Danwon art festival and since 1996 the Sung-ho cultural festival is held. The Ansan Street Arts Festival is held in Ansan Culture Square in May since 2005.
Other festivals in Ansan include:
 Ansan Kim Hong-do Festival (September)
 Ansan Daebu Island: The scent of ocean tulip festival (April)
 Ansan Street Arts Festival (May)
 Ansan Valley Rock Festival (July)
 Byeolmangseong Art Festival (September)
 Seongho Cultural Festival (May)

Historical monuments and structures
Historical monuments and structures in Ansan include:
 Ansan Town Wall
 Byeolmangseong Fortress
 Cheongmundang
 Daebudo Island Charity Monument (Daebudo Jaseonbi)
 Gosong Pavilion
 Hong Jeonghui Gate of Filial Duty (Hongjeonghui Hyojamun)
 Jaetmeori Local God Shrine
 Korean Juniper Tree in Palgok-ri
 Ojeonggak Pavilion
 Sasechungyeolmun (Shrine of Loyalty, Virtue and Filial Duty) 
 Seonbu-dong Dolmens
 Ssanggyesa Temple
 Tomb of Ahn Tandae
 Tomb of Choi Hon
 Tomb of Gang Jing
 Tomb of General Choi Jeong-geoi
 Tomb of Han Eungin
 Tomb of Hong Cheoyun
 Tomb of Jeong Eonbyeok
 Tomb of Princess Jeongjeong
 Tomb of Yi Ik
 Tomb of Yi Inhyeon
 Tomb of Yu Seok
 Tomb of Yun Gang

Modern monuments and cultural institutions
Modern monuments and cultural institutions in Ansan include:
Gyeonggi Museum of Art (sometimes known as the Ansan Art Museum)
Ansan Botanical Garden
Ansan Cultural Center
Ansan Culture and Arts Center
Ansan Lighthouse
Ansan Sled Park
Choi Yong-sin Memorial Hall
Fishing Village Folk Museum
Gyeonggi English Village Ansan Camp  (also known as Ansan Hwajeong English Village)
Olympic Memorial Hall
Seongho Memorial Hall

Parks and natural landmarks

Ansan is home to several parks, including:
 Ansan Lake Park
 Daebu Island
 Hwarang Public Garden
 Lake Sihwaho
 Mt. Gwangdeoksan
 Mt. Surisan
 Nojeok Bong Park
 Seongho Park
 Seongpo Arts Square
 Sihwaho Lake Reed Marsh Park
 Marronniergongwon Park

Sports
Large and small stadiums have been founded from the 1990s on in Ansan. Major sports events in the city take place at the Ansan Wa~ Stadium.

The city was home to Shinhan Bank S-Bird Woman's Basketball Team (member of the Women's Korean Basketball League). The team moved to Incheon in 2014. It was also a home to the now-defunct National League soccer club Ansan Hallelujah.

Ansan is also home to Ansan OK Financial Group Okman volleyball club. They are members of the V-League.

Ansan established a professional football team called the Ansan Greeners FC. In first year, the team also received the 'Plus Stadium' award and the "Full Stadium" award. At present (April 10, 2018), the Ansan Grinders FC has placed second.

Television series and films
The pension complex on Daebu Island is used as a location for dramas such as Boys Over Flowers and A Man Called God.
A Man Called God
Boys Over Flowers
Designated Survivor: 60 Days
Heading to the Ground
The Last Scandal of My Life
The Secret of Birth

Sister cities

Sister cities (foreign cities)
 Anshan, Liaoning, China
 Las Vegas, Nevada, United States
 Yuzhno-Sakhalinsk, Russia
 Kholmsk, Russia

Sister cities (domestic cities)
Haenam County
Cheongyang County
Chuncheon
Jecheon

Friendly Cooperation Cities
 Waldviertel (Zwettl), Austria
 San Fernando, Philippines
 Bà Rịa–Vũng Tàu province, Vietnam
 Yantai, Shandong, China

Government offices
Korean Ocean Research and Development Institute
Korea Electrotechnology Research Institute
Metropolitan Air Quality Management Office
Korea Institute of Industrial Technology
Korea Testing Laboratory

Mayors
 1st - Jeon Chang-seon (January 1, 1986 ~ February 10, 1988)
 2nd - Jang Ui-jin (February 11, 1988 ~ June 4, 1988)
 3rd - Lee Sang-yong (June 5, 1988 ~ December 26, 1989)
 4th - Lee Soo-yeong (December 27, 1989 ~ January 2, 1992)
 5th - Cho Gun-ho (January 3, 1992 ~ January 10, 1993)
 6th - Kim Tae-su (January 11, 1993 ~ October 5, 1994)
 7th - Choi Soon-sik (October 5, 1994 ~ June 30, 1995)
 8th - Song Jin-sub (July 1, 1995 ~ June 30, 1998)
 9th - Park Sung-gyu (July 1, 1998 ~ June 30, 2002)
 10th - Song Jin-sub (July 1, 2002 ~ June 30, 2006)
 11th - Park Joo-won (July 1, 2006 ~ June 30, 2010)
 12th - Kim Chul-min (July 1, 2010 ~ June 30, 2014)
 13th - Je Jong-geel (July 1, 2014 ~ June 30, 2018)
 14th - Yoon Hwa-seop (July 1, 2018~ June 30, 2022)
 15th - Lee Min-Geun (July 1, 2022~)

Notable people from Ansan
Actors: Lee Chung-ah, Lee Tae-sung
Models: Hye-rim Park
Singers: Lee Ji-hyun (Jewelry), Kang Seul-gi (Red Velvet), Choi Soobin (TXT), Jo Haseul (Loona), Bang Jae-min 
Baseball players: Kim Kwang-hyun, Kim Min-woo
Cartoonists: Lee Mal-nyeon
Volleyball players: Kim Yeon-koung
Soccer players: Cho Gue-sung

Exchanges
Council of the National Multicultural City 
Council of the National Lifelong Learning City 
Metropolitan mayor nationwide council

See also
 List of islands in Ansan
 Ansan street arts festival
 Korea Digital Media High School

References

External links

City government website 

 
Cities in Gyeonggi Province
Populated places established in 1986
Planned cities in South Korea
1986 establishments in South Korea